Simon Benoît (born September 19, 1998) is a Canadian professional ice hockey defenceman currently playing for the  Anaheim Ducks of the National Hockey League (NHL).

Playing career
Benoît played as a youth Ligue de hockey M18 AAA du Québec (LHMU18AAA) with Laval-Montréal Rousseau Royal before he was drafted by the Shawinigan Cataractes in the eighth round, 129th overall, of the 2015 QMJHL Entry Draft.

Benoît played three seasons in the Quebec Major Junior Hockey League with the Cataractes before he was signed as an undrafted free agent to a one-year contract with the San Diego Gulls of the American Hockey League, the primary affiliate of the Anaheim Ducks on September 25, 2018. In his first professional year with the Gulls in the 2018–19 season, Benoît impressed by leading the Gulls in Plus/Minus with +16 and collecting 2 goals and 16 points through 65 regular season games. On March 8, 2019, he was signed by the Ducks to a three-year, entry-level contract beginning in the 2019–20 season. 

During the 2020–21 season, while in his third year with the San Diego Gulls and adding dependable defensive play on the blueline, Benoît was recalled by the Ducks to make his NHL debut on April 29, 2021. While appearing on the Ducks third defensive pairing, Benoît went scoreless with 12 minutes time on ice in a 3–2 victory over the Los Angeles Kings.
On October 28, 2021, Benoît scored his first NHL goal, a game tying goal, against the Buffalo Sabres in a 4-3 OT loss.

Career statistics

References

External links
 

1998 births
Living people
Anaheim Ducks players
Canadian ice hockey defencemen
Ice hockey people from Quebec
San Diego Gulls (AHL) players
Shawinigan Cataractes players
Sportspeople from Laval, Quebec
Undrafted National Hockey League players